The 6th District of the Iowa House of Representatives in the state of Iowa.

Current elected officials
Jacob Bossman is the representative currently representing the district.

Past representatives
The district has previously been represented by:
 Berl E. Priebe, 1971–1973
 Dennis L. Freeman, 1973–1975
 Keith Baker, 1975–1979
 Richard L. Groth, 1979–1983
 Wilmer Rensink, 1983–1987
 Lee J. Plasier, 1987–1993
 Richard P. Vande Hoef, 1993–1999
 David Johnson, 1999–2003
 Greg Stevens, 2003–2005
 Mike May, 2005–2011
 Jeff Smith, 2011–2013
 Ron Jorgensen, 2013–2017
 Jim Carlin, 2017–2018
 Jacob Bossman, 2018–present

References

006